Limo is a village in the Les Anglais commune of the Chardonnières Arrondissement, in the Sud department of Haiti.

See also
Boco
Chanterelle
Dernere Morne
Les Anglais (town)

References

Populated places in Sud (department)